Sir Charles Bagot GCB (23 September 1781 – 19 May 1843) was a British politician, diplomat and colonial administrator. He served as ambassador to the United States, Russia, and the Netherlands. He served as the second Governor General of the Province of Canada from 1841 to 1843.

Early life, family, education, political career
He was the second son of William Bagot, 1st Baron Bagot of Blithfield Hall, Staffordshire. He was educated at Rugby School and Christ Church, Oxford. He entered Lincoln's Inn, where he studied law, but left and returned to Oxford to complete his master's degree.

His marriage to the wealthy Mary Charlotte Anne Wellesley-Pole, the niece of Arthur Wellesley, 1st Duke of Wellington, and other Bagot family connections made possible his subsequent diplomatic career.

Bagot served as Member of Parliament for Castle Rising from 1807 to 1808.

Diplomatic career

Ambassador to United States
He was named minister plenipotentiary and envoy extraordinaire to the United States on 31 July 1815, in the aftermath of the War of 1812. With Richard Rush, he negotiated the Rush–Bagot Treaty to limit naval forces on the Great Lakes and Lake Champlain. He also contributed to negotiations leading to the Anglo-American Convention of 1818, which defined the border between British North America and the United States from Lake of the Woods (see Northwest Angle) to the Pacific Ocean. Bagot ended his term in Washington, D.C. in 1820.

Ambassador to Russia, Netherlands
He subsequently served as British Ambassador to Russia, where he took part in negotiations leading to the 1825 Treaty of Saint Petersburg.

Then, he served as British Ambassador to the Netherlands, where he was involved in negotiations leading to the establishment of Belgium in 1831.

Colonial administrator

Governor General of Canada
After a hiatus of ten years from diplomatic service, Bagot agreed to succeed Lord Sydenham as governor general of the newly proclaimed Province of Canada. He was chosen because of his diplomatic knowledge of the United States. Bagot was appointed 27 September 1841, and arrived in the Canadian capital Kingston on 10 January 1842, taking office two days later.

Bagot was ordered by the British government to resist the strengthening demands for responsible government. As an important concession, however, Bagot did allow the leading Canadian colonial politicians Robert Baldwin and Sir Louis-Hippolyte Lafontaine to form a ministry, on the basis of their parliamentary majority. Lafontaine, as a French-Canadian leader, had suffered abusive treatment by the British under the previous governor general, Lord Sydenham, who had died in office in 1841. This was the beginning of what became known as representative government in Canada. Bagot's leadership was an important step forward in establishing more amicable relations between the colonizing British and French.

Bagot worked productively with Baldwin and Lafontaine to establish a structure for fair municipal governance in the province of Canada. Their work has stood the test of time. With the arrival of Confederation in 1867, a well-defined system of three-tiered governance—federal, provincial, and municipal—came into being in Ontario and Quebec.

While serving as governor-general, Bagot ordered the first criminal extradition of a fugitive slave to the United States from Canada West. The fugitive in question, Nelson Hacket (or Hackett), had been valet and butler to a wealthy Arkansas slave owner. In 1841, Hacket stole a beaver overcoat and a racing mare from his master, as well as a gold watch and a saddle from two others, and fled to Canada West. Hacket's master caught up with him in Chatham, Ontario, and Hacket was jailed. Governor-General Bagot ruled Hacket had committed a crime by stealing items not necessary for his escape, and for this reason he was extradited. The public in Canada West, as well as abolitionists in the U.S. and Canada, were dismayed, and their displeasure led to a formal treaty, which codified rules for extradition, but upset fugitives, abolitionists, and slave owners.

In 1842 Bagot initiated a major review of government policies and expenditures related to Indigenous peoples in Canada East and Canada West, appointing Rawson W. Rawson, John Davidson and William Hepburn as report commissioners. Completed in 1844, the final report, titled the Report on the affairs of the Indians in Canada, included a call for the introduction of industrial schools to address the noted failure of day schools to effectively keep Indigenous children from the influence of their parents and is regarded as a foundational document in the rationale for establishing the Canadian Indian residential school system.

University administrator
He served as Chancellor of King's College, (now the University of Toronto), 1842–1843.

Death
Having resigned his governor general's office in January 1843, Bagot died four months later at the vice-regal residence, Alwington House, Alwington, Kingston, too ill to return to the United Kingdom.

Legacy
Today, he is chiefly remembered for his role in developing the Residential school system, his contributions to the development of the "undefended border" between the United States and Canada, and for fostering more cooperative and positive political relations between the two main colonial groups of British and French settlers.

Bagot Street, a main thoroughfare in downtown Kingston, is named in his memory.

Family

Right Hon. Sir Charles Bagot, Bart., G.C.B., married Lady Mary Charlotte Anne Wellesley, daughter of William Wellesley-Pole, 3rd Earl of Mornington on 22 July 1806. The couple had three sons and five daughters. The family accompanied their parents to Canada, on the appointment of Sir Charles Bagot as Governor-General of British North America on 12 January 1842. As the wife of a Governor-General in Canada, Lady Bagot assumed the title of "Her Excellency" in Montreal in August 1842. After her husband's death at Kingston, Ontario, on 18 May 1843, she accompanied his remains to England. She died in London on 2 February 1845.

References

External links 
 
 
 

1781 births
1843 deaths
People educated at Rugby School
Alumni of Christ Church, Oxford
Governors-General of the Province of Canada
Knights Grand Cross of the Order of the Bath
People from the Borough of East Staffordshire
Ambassadors of the United Kingdom to Russia
Younger sons of barons
Members of the Parliament of the United Kingdom for English constituencies
UK MPs 1807–1812
Persons of National Historic Significance (Canada)
Ambassadors of the United Kingdom to the United States
Ambassadors of the United Kingdom to the Netherlands